A Very Larry Christmas is an album by American comedian Larry the Cable Guy, released on November 16, 2004, on Warner Bros. Records. It is composed of radio commentaries dealing with Christmas, as well as musical tracks.

Track listing (2004 Warner Bros. version)
"Christmas Commentary" - 2:25
"The Christmas Story" - 2:16
"Santy for a Day" - 1:38
"Oh Holy Crap" - 0:15
"Fat Holiday Relatives" - 1:29
"Singing Christmas Tree" - 1:35
"A Letter to Shania Twain" - 2:23
"O Little Girl from Birmingham" - 0:21
"Waiter Commentary" - 1:33
"Donny the Retard" - 0:09
"Pissed-Off Christmas Poem" - 1:39
"The Most Wonderful Ass" - 0:18
"Titty Bar Christmas" - 2:09
"Easy-to-Assemble" - 1:52
"The First Queer Santy Claus" - 0:16
"Fruitcake Commentary" - 2:07
"Santy Claus, Santy Claus" - 2:25
"I Pissed My Pants" - 0:25
"Christmas Weight Gain" - 1:34
"Grandpa's Thanksgiving Story" - 2:07
"On the First Day of Christmas" - 0:08
"Redneck Santa Claus" - 1:09
"Hark, The Hairlip Angel" - 0:10
"A Letter to Santa Claus" - 1:44
"Sticks and Horse Turds" - 1:23
"Call a Doctor" - 0:18
"Gift Giving" - 2:12
"I Wish My Mother-in-Law'd Get Hit by a Car" - 0:28

Charts

Weekly charts

Year-end charts

Certifications

References 

Larry the Cable Guy albums
Warner Records albums
2004 Christmas albums
Christmas albums by American artists
2000s comedy albums